Jane Hardy Cease (born January 23, 1936), was an American politician who was a member of the Oregon House of Representatives and Oregon State Senate.

Cease was born in Columbus, Mississippi and attended Tulane University. She married Ron Cease in 1960; they moved to Oregon in 1966. She served in the Oregon House of Representatives from 1979 to 1985, when she resigned to serve in the Oregon State Senate. Her replacement to the seat was her husband, Ron. She served in the State Senate from 1985 to 1991, when she was succeeded once again by her husband, Ron.

References

1936 births
Living people
Democratic Party members of the Oregon House of Representatives
Democratic Party Oregon state senators
People from Columbus, Mississippi
Tulane University alumni
Women state legislators in Oregon
Politicians from Portland, Oregon
21st-century American women